Esther Bottomley (born 8 February 1983) is an Australian cross-country skier who has competed since 2000. Competing in three Winter Olympics, she earned her best finish of 50th in the individual sprint event at Vancouver in 2010.

Bottomley's best finish at the FIS Nordic World Ski Championships was 50th twice, both in the sprint event (2003. 2005).

Her best World Cup finish was 18th in a team sprint event at Canada in 2009.

References

1983 births
Australian female cross-country skiers
Cross-country skiers at the 2006 Winter Olympics
Cross-country skiers at the 2010 Winter Olympics
Cross-country skiers at the 2014 Winter Olympics
Living people
Olympic cross-country skiers of Australia